Noora Komulainen (née Tamminen) (born 30 October 1990) is a Finnish professional golfer and Ladies European Tour player. She won the 2022 Aramco Team Series – Sotogrande team event together with Tereza Melecká and Jessica Korda.

Career
Komulainen was a member of the Finland National Team as an amateur. At the 2012 Espirito Santo Trophy she won a bronze medal together with Krista Bakker and Sanna Nuutinen.

In 2013, she turned professional and joined the Ladies European Tour. She recorded ten top-10 finishes 2013–2019, including a fourth place at the 2016 Lalla Meryem Cup, after which she rose to the top 250 in the Women's World Golf Rankings.

Komulainen represented Finland at the 2016 Summer Olympics where she finished tied for 48th.

In 2022, she won the Aramco Team Series – Sotogrande team event in Spain together with Jessica Korda, LET rookie Tereza Melecká, and polo player Malcolm Borwick, one stroke ahead of a team led by Pauline Roussin-Bouchard.

Amateur wins
2011 Mandatum Life Final
2012 Paltamo Ladies Open, Finnish Stroke Play

Source:

Team appearances
Amateur
European Ladies' Team Championship (representing Finland): 2009, 2010, 2011
Espirito Santo Trophy (representing Finland): 2010, 2012

References

External links

Finnish female golfers
Ladies European Tour golfers
Olympic golfers of Finland
Golfers at the 2016 Summer Olympics
Sportspeople from Tampere
People from Tuusula
1990 births
Living people